Club Deportivo Hielo Bipolo, also known as Escor BAKH by sponsorship reasons, is an ice hockey team in Vitoria-Gasteiz, Spain. They play in the Liga Nacional de Hockey Hielo, the top level of ice hockey in Spain.

History

CD Hielo Bipolo was founded in 2012. In 2013, the team achieved its first national league and qualified to play the 2013–14 IIHF Continental Cup.

In September 2014, the senior ice hockey team of the club ceased in activity.

Achievements
Spanish League: (2)
2012–13, 2013–14
Spanish Cup: (1)
2014
Spanish Supercup: (1)
2013

References

External links
 Official website
 Spanish Ice Hockey Federation

Ice hockey clubs established in 2012
Sport in Vitoria-Gasteiz
Ice hockey teams in the Basque Country
2012 establishments in Spain